Ed Munro was an American politician who served as a member of the King County Council from 1969 to 1974. A member of the Democratic Party, he represented the 7th district.

References 

King County Councillors
Democratic Party members of the Washington House of Representatives